Ramón Ceja Romero (born 7 May 1969) is a Mexican politician affiliated with the National Action Party. As of 2006 he served as Deputy of the LX Legislature of the Mexican Congress representing Michoacán.

References

1969 births
Living people
People from Zamora, Michoacán
Politicians from Michoacán
National Action Party (Mexico) politicians
21st-century Mexican politicians
20th-century Mexican politicians
Universidad Michoacana de San Nicolás de Hidalgo alumni
National Autonomous University of Mexico alumni
Members of the Congress of Michoacán
Deputies of the LX Legislature of Mexico
Members of the Chamber of Deputies (Mexico) for Michoacán